Nikephoros Phokas can refer to:

 Nikephoros II Phokas (died 969), distinguished Byzantine general and Emperor from 963 to 969
Nikephoros Phokas the Elder (died ca. 896/900), an eminent Byzantine general, grandfather of emperor Nikephoros II Phokas
Nikephoros Phokas Barytrachelos (died 1022), great-nephew of the emperor and rebel
Nikiforos Fokas, a municipality in Greece named after the emperor